Johanna Dejager (born in 1969) is a Canadian professional female bodybuilder. She currently lives in Ottawa, Ontario.

Early life
Of Dutch ancestry, Dejager grew up on a dairy farm. The rigors of daily work and chores laid a foundation for her future career. At the age of 10, she saw on a TV profile of a male bodybuilder, which inspired her to enter the sport. Dejager obtained a degree in graphic design in 1990 and started up her own business two years later. She started training in 1993.

Bodybuilding career
In 1998 in drug-tested events were introduced which Dejager supported and competed within that stream. In 2006, representing Canada on the IFBB World stage, Dejager won silver (2nd place) in the Light Weight class. In 2008, after finishing 1st in Middle Weight and 1st in Masters at the 2008 CBBF Nationals, Dejager won her Pro Card.

In 2009, she competed in the Arnold IFBB World Amateur Bodybuilding Championships, where she won gold in Light Weight class.

Contest history
1995 Kingston BodyBuilding Championships - 1st (Open weight class)
1995 Sudbury BodyBuilding Championships - 1st(HW)
1996 Ontario BodyBuilding Championships - 2nd (HW)
1997 Ontario BodyBuilding Championships - 1st (MW)
1997 Canadian BodyBuilding Championships - 9th (HW)
1999 Ontario National Qualifier - 1st (MW), Overall
1999 CBBF World Qualifier - 4th (MW)
2001 Ontario National Qualifier - 1st (MW), Overall
2001 CBBF World Qualifier - 1st (MW), Overall
2001 IFBB World Women's Amateur Championships - 10th (MW)
2002 CBBF World Qualifier  - 2nd (MW)
2003 CBBF World Qualifier - 1st (MW), Overall
2003 IFBB Women's World Amateur Bodybuilding Championships - 11th (MW)
2004 CBBF World Qualifier - 1st (MW), Overall
2004 IFBB Women's World Amateur Bodybuilding Championships - 8th (MW)
2005 CBBF World Qualifier - 2nd Place
2006 IFBB Women's World Amateur Bodybuilding Championships - 2nd (LW) Silver
2006 CBBF World Qualifier - 1st (LW), 1st (master), Overall
2007 CBBF World Qualifier - 1st (LW0, 1st (master), Overall
2007 CBBF Nationals - 3rd (MW), 3rd (master)
2007 IFBB Women's World Amateur Bodybuilding Championships - 4th (under 55kg class)
2007 IFBB Women's Masters World Amateur Bodybuilding Championships - 9th Place (open weight class)
2008 IFBB Amateur North American Championships - 3rd (MW)
2008 CBBF Nationals - 1st (MW), 1st (masters) - IFBB PRO (status awarded)
2009 Arnold IFBB World Amateur Bodybuilding Championships - 1st (LW)

References

External links
http://fibofoto.de/profiles/international/dejager/index.html

1969 births
Canadian female bodybuilders
Living people
Professional bodybuilders